Gabriela Medvedovski (born 29 June 1992) is a Brazilian actress. She became known for starring the Malhação in 2017, TV Globo soap opera. She is the protagonist of the series As Five on the Globoplay streaming platform and is in the cast of the soap opera Nos Tempos do Imperador, of Rede Globo.

Career
In 2014, she was part of the group Teen Broadway, she starred in the productions of The Adventures of Priscilla, Queen of the Desert and Cabaret. In 2015 she played the Crystal Ballerina in the traditional Christmas musical Natal Luz, in Gramado, which celebrated 30 years of performances every end of the year. Between 2016 and 2017 she was part of the cast of the musical Godspell: In Search of Love alongside Leonardo Miggiorin and Beto Sargentelli, playing Robin Lamont. [14] In 2017, he moved to Rio de Janeiro when he passed the tests for Malhação: Viva a Diferença, the twenty-fifth season of youth telenovela, where he won the post of one of the protagonists, Keyla, a teenage mother who suffers prejudice for being above of weight and tries to find the father of her son, an adventure of which she only knows the name. In 2020, she became the protagonist of the series "As Five", Globoplay's original production. In 2021, she was cast to be one of the protagonists of the soap opera Nos Tempos do Imperador.

Filmography

Television

Movies

Theater

References

External links
 

1992 births
Living people
21st-century Brazilian actresses
Brazilian television actresses
Brazilian film actresses